When Alto Was King is the final album recorded by American saxophonist C. I. Williams released in 1997 on the Mapleshade label a quarter century after his previous album.

Reception

AllMusic awarded the album 4 stars stating "this superb-sounding album is a fitting showcase for Williams' alto talents". In JazzTimes Willard Jenkins wrote "Mr. Williams has a buttery tone that is delivered with authority and the veteran's sense of relaxed swing. His tone bending, for example, is done very subtly and with a knowingness that never announces the arrival of the next bended note. He plays it with a liquidity and fluid sense of phrasing that makes every piece a study in elegance".

Track listing
All compositions by C. I. Williams except as indicated
 "You'd Be So Nice to Come Home To" (Cole Porter) - 5:12
 "Punkin Juice" - 5:45
 "'Round Midnight" (Thelonious Monk) - 8:08
 "Catfish Sammich" - 4:57
 "Misty" (Erroll Garner) - 5:57
 "Lover Man" (Jimmy Davis, Ram Ramirez, James Sherman) - 6:32
 "Because of You" (Arthur Hammerstein, Dudley Wilkinson) - 3:29
 "Jeep's Blues" (Duke Ellington, Johnny Hodges) - 6:55
 "I'll Close My Eyes" (Buddy Kaye, Billy Reid) - 5:03
 "Avalon" (Buddy DeSylva, Al Jolson, Vincent Rose) - 2:37
 "Precious Lord" (Thomas A. Dorsey) - 2:07

Personnel 
C. I. Williams - alto saxophone
Larry Willis - piano (tracks 1-7, 10 & 11) 
Don Blackman - piano (tracks 8 & 9) 
Ed Cherry - guitar
Keter Betts - bass
Jimmy Cobb - drums

References 

1997 albums
Charles Williams (musician) albums
Mapleshade Records albums